Crozier is an unincorporated community in Goochland County, Virginia, United States. Crozier has a post office with ZIP code 23039.

The First Union School, a Rosenwald school; and Springdale, a historic brick farmhouse built about 1800, are listed on the National Register of Historic Places.

Today, Crozier is the location of the Basic Correctional Officer's Academy. The state's Correctional Officers are trained here.

Climate
The climate in this area is characterized by hot, humid summers and generally mild to cool winters.  According to the Köppen Climate Classification system, Crozier has a humid subtropical climate, abbreviated "Cfa" on climate maps.

References

Unincorporated communities in Goochland County, Virginia
Unincorporated communities in Virginia